MTR Gaming Group was a gaming company based in Chester, West Virginia that operated horse racing tracks and racinos. It was formed on March 7, 1988, in Wilmington, Delaware. On September 19, 2014, it merged with Eldorado Holdco LLC, forming Eldorado Resorts in Reno, Nevada.

Properties
The properties owned and operated by MTR Gaming at the time of its acquisition were:
 Mountaineer Casino, Racetrack and Resort – Chester, West Virginia
 Presque Isle Downs and Casino – Summit Township, Erie County, Pennsylvania
 Scioto Downs Racino – Columbus, Ohio

Former
Properties previously owned by the company include:
 Binion's Gambling Hall and Hotel – Las Vegas, Nevada – Acquired from Harrah's Entertainment in 2005, sold to TLC Entertprises in 2008
 Jackson Harness Raceway – Jackson, Michigan – Closed in 2008
 The Ramada Inn and Speedway Casino – North Las Vegas, Nevada – Sold to Ganaste in 2008.

References

1988 establishments in the United States
2014 disestablishments in West Virginia
American companies established in 1988
Gambling companies established in 1988
Gambling companies disestablished in 2014
Defunct companies based in West Virginia
Defunct gambling companies
Gambling companies of the United States
Horse racing venue owners
Hospitality companies of the United States